Southern Sun may refer to: 

 "Southern Sun/Ready Steady Go", a 2002 single by Paul Oakenfold
 "Southern Sun" (Boy & Bear song), a 2013 single by Boy & Bear
 Southern Sun Hotel Group, is a South African hotel group